Lanttusupikas, also known as Syrjikäs, is a traditional pastry from Finland.

Lanttusupikas is a double-folded buttered flaky crust pie, filled with thin, braised swede slices and pork loin.

See also
 List of pies

References

External links 
 Kotikokki recipes (in Finnish)
 K-Food recipes (in Finnish)

Finnish pastries
Savoury pies
National dishes